The Sergeant Bluff-Luton School District is a rural public school district located in Sergeant Bluff, Iowa.

The school district, entirely in Woodbury County, provides education for students living in Sergeant Bluff and Luton. A small portion of Sioux City is in the district boundaries.

Many students also open-enroll from nearby Sioux City.

Schools

Primary school
Located on 206 South D St, Sergeant Bluff-Luton Primary School is the oldest of the four schools in the district, completed in 1959 (according to its foundation plaque on display at the front office in the building). It has 42 staff and approximately 450 students.

Elementary school
As the newest school in the district, the school was completed in time to host the class of 2001 as the first class to graduate from its new gymnasium (completed in the summer of 2000 according to the official dedication plaque outside the main office).  The school hosts the 3rd, 4th, and 5th grades.

Middle school
The Sergeant Bluff-Luton Middle School is located on 208 Port Neal Road, Sergeant Bluff, Iowa. The third oldest school in the district, it was completed in time for the class of 1989 to graduate (according to the official plaque outside the main office in the building).  The school houses the 6th, 7th and 8th grades with about 400 students currently enrolled.

High school
The Sergeant Bluff-Luton High School is a public school located in Sergeant Bluff, Iowa. The school provides education for Sergeant Bluff students, as well as students in nearby Luton, Iowa.

Located at 708 Warrior Road, Sergeant Bluff-Luton High School is the second oldest of the four schools in the district, completed in 1977 (according to the plaque located outside the main office in the building). The first class to graduate from this building was the class of 1978.

Because of a steady growth in school attendance, propositions for an addition have been brought up, but have been voted against.

In May 2010, the district had begun planning out and zoning for more parking lot space to be added. The project was completed by the beginning of the 2010–11 school year.

Athletics 
The Warriors compete in the Missouri River Conference in the following sports:

Baseball 
Basketball
Bowling
Cross Country 
Football
Golf 
Soccer 
Softball 
Track and Field 
 Boys' 2019 Class 3A State Champions
Volleyball 
 2019 Class 4A State Champions
Wrestling

Format
All 4 of the Sergeant Bluff-Luton schools follow a Semester format and the High School uses block scheduling with four 90 minute classes a day.

Students have alternating "A" and "B" days and therefore only have each of their classes two or three times a week.

The district converted to semesters from trimesters for the 2010-11 year.

See also
 List of school districts in Iowa
List of high schools in Iowa

References

External links
 Sergeant Bluff-Luton Community School District
 
 City official site

School districts in Iowa
Education in Woodbury County, Iowa
School districts established in 1958
1958 establishments in Iowa